Superphenalene is a very large polycyclic aromatic hydrocarbon (PAH) with chemical formula C96H30. It can be formally considered to consist of three  fused superbenzenes (hexa-peri-hexabenzocoronene).

It can be considered as an overlapping structure of three hexa-peri-hexabenzocoronenes arranged symmetrically around a center. These have also been known as building blocks of molecular electronics since 2004 as they form self-assembling columns and nanotubes.

Occurrence 
It is not known to occur naturally.

Properties 

Superphenalene has a planar geometry. With 540,000  mesomeric boundary structures, it has significantly more than hexabenzocoronene (250), supernaphthalene (16,100) and also buckminsterfullerene (12,500). The molecule has a threefold symmetry axis perpendicular to the molecule (C3).

References 

Polycyclic aromatic hydrocarbons